Paku may refer to:

Languages
Paku language (also known as Karen), spoken by the Sgaw Karen people of Myanmar and Thailand
Paku language (Indonesia), an endangered language of Borneo

People
Paku Alam, a series of Kings of Pakualam Principality in Indonesia
Teja Paku Alam (born 1994), Indonesian footballer
Shannon Paku (born 1980), New Zealand rugby player

Places
Lubuk Paku, in Malaysia
Paku Alaman, in Indonesia
Ulu Paku, in Malaysia

Other
PAKU, ICAO airport code for Ugnu–Kuparuk Airport in Alaska, United States
Paku Divinity School, in Myanmar
Paku Karen Baptist Association, in Myanmar

See also

Pacu (disambiguation)